Uncanny Magazine is an American science fiction and fantasy online magazine, edited and published by Lynne M. Thomas and Michael Damian Thomas, based in Urbana, Illinois. Its mascot is a space unicorn.

The editors-in-chief, who originally edited Apex Magazine from 2012–2013, chose the name of the magazine because they say it "has a wonderful pulp feel", and like how the name evokes the unexpected. They created the magazine "in the spirit of pulp sci-fi mags popular in the 1960s and '70s."

Uncanny has been published bimonthly, beginning in November 2014, after receiving initial funding through Kickstarter. It continues to fund itself through crowdfunding as well as subscriptions, which numbered 4,000 in 2017.

The magazine publishes original works by authors such as Neil Gaiman, Elizabeth Bear, Paul Cornell, Catherynne M. Valente, Charlie Jane Anders, Seanan McGuire, Mary Robinette Kowal, Javier Grillo-Marxuach, Alex Bledsoe, Nalo Hopkinson, Jane Yolen, Naomi Novik, N.K. Jemisin, G. Willow Wilson, Carmen Maria Machado, Amal El-Mohtar, Ursula Vernon, Kameron Hurley and Ken Liu, and published early stories by Alyssa Wong and Brooke Bolander. Each issue includes new short stories, one reprint, new poems, non-fiction essays, and a pair of interviews. The magazine pays its authors and artists. It also produces a podcast where some of the magazine's content is read aloud. They have a staff of 10 editors and receive between 1,000 and 2,000 submissions every month.

In 2018, they published a disability-themed issue called Disabled People Destroy Science Fiction with content exclusively from disabled creators. This was a continuation of the Destroy series originally from Lightspeed magazine; in it, the authors and illustrators envisioned "a truly accessible future is one that features rather than erases the disabled mind and body". The issue won an Aurora Award for Best Related Work in 2019.

Awards and recognition
In 2017, Uncanny won the 2016 Hugo Award for Best Semiprozine, and one of its published stories, "Folding Beijing" by Hao Jingfang translated by Ken Liu, won the Hugo Award for Best Novelette. It since went on to win the Hugo Award for Best Semiprozine every year from 2016 through 2020.

Magazine awards

Art awards 
 2016 Gold Spectrum Award – Editorial Category – "Traveling to a Distant" Day by Tran Nguyen (Uncanny Magazine #4 Cover)
 2016 Chesley Awards – Best Cover Illustration: Magazine – "Traveling to a Distant Day" by Tran Nguyen (Uncanny Magazine #4 Cover)
 2017 Chesley Awards – Best Cover Illustration: Magazine – "Bubbles and Blast Off" by Galen Dara (Uncanny Magazine #10)

Content awards 
 2015 William Atheling Jr. Award for Criticism or Review – "Does Sex Make Science Fiction 'Soft'?" by Tansy Rayner Roberts (Uncanny Magazine #1)
 2016 Hugo Award for Best Novelette – "Folding Beijing" by Hao Jingfang, translated by Ken Liu (Uncanny Magazine #2)
 2017 Locus Award for Best Novelette – "You'll Surely Drown Here If You Stay" by Alyssa Wong (Uncanny Magazine #10)
 2017 Rhysling Award–Best Long Poem – "Rose Child" by Theodora Goss (Uncanny Magazine #13)
 2018 Eugie Award – "Clearly Lettered in a Mostly Steady Hand" by Fran Wilde (Uncanny Magazine #18)
 2019 World Fantasy Award—Short Fiction – "Like a River Loves the Sky" by Emma Törzs (Uncanny Magazine #21)
 2020 Ignyte Awards–Best in Creative Nonfiction – "Black Horror Rising" by Tananarive Due (Uncanny Magazine #28)
 2021 Hugo Awards–Best Short Story – "Metal Like Blood in the Dark" by Ursula Vernon, as T. Kingfisher (Uncanny Magazine #36)
 2022 Nebula Award for Best Short Story – "Where Oaken Hearts Do Gather" by Sarah Pinsker (Uncanny Magazine #39)
 2022 Locus Award for Best Novelette – "That Story Isn't the Story" by John Wiswell (Uncanny Magazine #43)
 2022 Locus Award for Best Short Story – "Where Oaken Hearts Do Gather" by Sarah Pinsker (Uncanny Magazine #39)
 2022 Eugie Award – "Where Oaken Hearts Do Gather" by Sarah Pinsker (Uncanny Magazine #39)
 2022 Hugo Award for Best Short Story – "Where Oaken Hearts Do Gather" by Sarah Pinsker (Uncanny Magazine #39)

Staff

Current staff

 Lynne M. Thomas – Publisher/Editor-in-Chief
 Michael Damian Thomas – Publisher/Editor-in-Chief
 Chimedum Ohaegbu – Managing Editor/Poetry Editor
 Meg Elison – Nonfiction Editor
 Erika Ensign – Podcast Producer
 Steven Schapansky – Podcast Producer
 Matt Peters – Podcast Reader
 Caroline M. Yoachim – Interviewer
 Naomi Day – Assistant Editor

Former staff
 Elsa Sjunneson – Nonfiction Editor
 Joy Piedmont – Podcast Reader
 Angel Cruz – Assistant Editor
 Michi Trota – Managing/Nonfiction Editor
 Stephanie Malia Morris – Podcast Reader
 Mimi Mondal – Poetry/Reprint Editor
 Julia Rios – Poetry/Reprint Editor
 Amal El-Mohtar – Podcast Reader
 C. S. E. Cooney – Podcast Reader
 Deborah Stanish – Interviewer
 Shana DuBois – Interviewer

References

External links 
 Official website

Science fiction magazines published in the United States
Fantasy fiction magazines
Bimonthly magazines published in the United States
Hugo Award-winning works
Online magazines published in the United States
Magazines established in 2014
Science fiction webzines
Speculative fiction podcasts